The Modular Airborne FireFighting System (MAFFS) is a self-contained unit used for aerial firefighting that can be loaded onto both military cargo transport Lockheed C-130 Hercules and Embraer C-390 Millennium, which then allows the aircraft to be used as an air tanker against wildfires. This allows the U.S. Forest Service (USFS) to use military aircraft from the Air National Guard and Air Force Reserve to serve as an emergency backup resource to the civilian air tanker fleet.

Development
 
Congress established the MAFFS program after the 1970 Laguna Fire overwhelmed the existing aviation firefighting resources. The USFS was directed to develop a program in cooperation with the Air National Guard and Air Force Reserve to produce the equipment, training and operational procedures to integrate military air tankers into the national response system. The Engineered Systems Division of FMC Corporation (Santa Clara, CA) was contracted to design, build and test the modular tank system that would enable a standard C-130 to be quickly converted into a tanker. Initial flight tests with a prototype two-tank installation began in July 1971. Subsequent systems were fabricated by Aero Union of Chico, California.

In addition to the retardant tanks, each module contains a pressure tank where compressed air is stored at 82.7 bar (1200 psi). The control module includes the master control panel, the loadmaster's seat, and discharge valves. An air compressor module provides air pressure for charging the system; it stays at the airtanker base during air operations and is used to recharge the system between runs. It can be installed in any C-130-E or -H equipped with the USAF 463L cargo-handling system.

Air tankers are categorized by their retardant capacity, and although the MAFFS capacity is just under , a MAFFS C-130 is considered a Type 1 air tanker, which is the largest class. Retardant exits through two tubes which extend out the plane's aft cargo bay doors. It can then be reloaded in eight minutes. 
Maffs Corp. is a combination of two leading aftermarket support companies, United Aeronautical Corporation and Blue Aerospace. As an owner of some applicable intellectual property, tooling, and assets related to the design and manufacturing of retardant delivery systems including MAFFS I and II and RADS II, Maffs Corp assists with the service and support of existing systems as well as the design and construction of new aerial tanking and effluent delivery systems.

MAFFS II

Aero Union, under contract to the USFS, has developed an improved version of the system, known as the MAFFS II. The original MAFFS has to be pressurized by a compressor on the ground as a part of the loading process. The ability to pressurize the system in the air cuts turn-around time significantly. The new system discharges the retardant through a special plug in the paratroop drop door on the side of the aircraft, rather than requiring the cargo ramp door to be opened; this allows the aircraft to remain pressurized during the drop sequence. Far more significantly, the cargo ramp and door can remain closed, cutting drag considerably, and thereby allowing a greater performance margin than available with MAFFS I.

Aero Union delivered the first production unit to the USFS in July 2007, and was flight tested during August. MAFFS II was used for the first time on a fire in July 2008, when a crew from the 302d Airlift Wing launched from McClellan Tanker Base in California on an operational test using a C-130H.

Operations

MAFFS equipment is stationed at eight locations around the United States. They are considered a "24-hour resource", meaning that when activated, it is expected that it will take 24 hours for the aircraft to arrive on scene, as the C-130s have to be pulled from their regular military duties and fitted with the MAFFS equipment. When needed, regional foresters can request a MAFFS activation after they have ascertained that all available commercial air tankers are assigned to on-going incidents or committed to an initial attack. The National Interagency Coordination Center at the National Interagency Fire Center (NIFC), Boise, Idaho, can activate the MAFFS when all other contract airtankers are committed to incidents or initial attack or are otherwise unable to meet requests for air operations. The request for MAFFS activation is approved by the national MAFFS liaison officer, who is the Forest Service director at NIFC. This request is then forwarded to the joint director of military support at the Pentagon. Governors of states where National Guard MAFFS units are stationed may activate MAFFS for missions within their state boundaries when covered by a memorandum of understanding with the military authority and the Forest Service.

During the 1994 fire season, one of the worst during that decade, the four airlift wings equipped with MAFFS flew nearly 2,000 missions and dropped  of retardant. In 2004, after all the large civilian tankers in the U.S. had been grounded due to safety concerns, MAFFS-equipped C-130s were pre-positioned in western states in anticipation of wildfires. Besides use on U.S. fires, MAFFS has been deployed to Mexico, Europe, Africa and Indonesia. International deployment is initiated by a foreign government's request through the U.S. State Department.

The military is reimbursed for the cost of operating MAFFS flights by the agency having jurisdiction over the fire.

MAFFS is in use in the Colombian Air Force, Brazilian Air Force, Royal Moroccan Air Force and the Royal Thai Air Force C-130s. It was also formerly used in the Portuguese Air Force C-130s.

Training
MAFFS crews are trained every year with USFS aviation operations personnel. The training is coordinated with the Air Force Reserve's 302d Airlift Wing at Colorado's Peterson Air Force Base, the Air National Guard's 153d Airlift Wing from Cheyenne, Wyoming, the 146th Airlift Wing from Port Hueneme, California, and the 152nd Airlift Wing from Reno, Nevada.

In January 2010, a mobile training team from the 302d Airlift Wing deployed to Thailand to train members of the 601 Transport Squadron at Don Muang Royal Thai Air Force Base in the use of MAFFS.

Accidents

On July 1, 2012, MAFFS #7, which belonged to the North Carolina Air National Guard's 145th Airlift Wing based at the Charlotte-Douglas International Airport, crashed while fighting the White Draw Fire in South Dakota's Black Hills. Four of the six crew aboard the C-130 Hercules died.

Service history
The MAFFS equipped C-130 Hercules continues to fly in May 2019. Training takes place in the U.S. at Colorado Springs, Colorado.

See also
Wildland fire suppression
Phos-Chek fire retardant

References

Francillon, René J. "Volant Forest: Fire-fighting MAFFS Herks". Air International, August 1993, Vol 45 No 2. Stamford, UK:Key Publishing. pp. 73–78. ISSN 0306-5634.

External links
  
 MAFFS Website
 MAFFS-related articles at www.af.mil
 302nd Airlift Wing MAFFS photo gallery
 MAFFS fact sheet from CDF
 302d Airlift Wing MAFFS in Thailand Feature
 Wildfire Today
 C-390 Millennium Firefighting Capability

Aerial firefighting
Firefighting equipment